MacArthur Boulevard is a road in Montgomery County, Maryland and Washington, D.C. The road follows a northwest–southeast route from the Great Falls area of the Chesapeake and Ohio Canal National Historical Park in Potomac, Maryland, to Foxhall Road NW and 44th Street NW in the Foxhall neighborhood of Washington, D.C., near the Georgetown Reservoir. MacArthur Boulevard runs parallel to the Clara Barton Parkway and the C&O Canal for most of its route, passing through the Palisades area of the District. In Cabin John, traffic is reduced to a single alternating lane as it passes over the Union Arch Bridge, the longest span masonry arch bridge in the Western Hemisphere, and which also carries the Washington Aqueduct.

History
The road was originally named Conduit Road, as it was built atop the Washington Aqueduct. The aqueduct delivers water from the Potomac River to the Dalecarlia Reservoir, which is the primary source of drinking water in the District of Columbia.

The road was renamed for General Douglas MacArthur on March 5, 1942, when a local resident living off the road proposed the name change to his friend, Texas representative Luther Alexander Johnson, who sponsored the bill in Congress.

Bike path
In 1975, a bike path, the MacArthur Boulevard Bike Trail, was built along MacArthur Boulevard from Berma Road to the south driveway for the Defense Mapping Agency Topographic Center (DMATC), a short distance from the District line. In 2013, the county began a project to rebuild the road and bikeway to make it safer and more pleasant. Segment 2, between I-495 and Oberlin Road, was completed in 2014. Segment 3, between Oberlin and DC is scheduled to begin in 2020. Segment 1 will rebuild the road and trail between I-495 and Berma Road.

Major intersections

References

Roads in Montgomery County, Maryland
Streets in Washington, D.C.
The Palisades (Washington, D.C.)